This article includes information translated from the Wikipedia article Château des ducs de Bretagne

The Château des ducs de Bretagne is a large castle located in the city of Nantes in the Loire-Atlantique département of France; it served as the centre of the historical province of Brittany until its separation in 1956. It is located on the right bank of the Loire, which formerly fed its ditches. It was the residence of the Dukes of Brittany between the 13th and 16th centuries, subsequently becoming the Breton residence of the French Monarchy.

The castle has been listed as a monument historique by the French Ministry of Culture since 1840. Today the castle houses the Nantes History Museum.

Restoration

Starting in the 1990s, the town of Nantes undertook a massive programme of restoration and repairs to return the site to its former glory as an emblem of the history of Nantes and Brittany. Following 15 years of works and three years of closure to the public, it was reopened on 9 February 2007 and is now a popular tourist attraction.

The restored edifice now includes the new Nantes History Museum, installed in 32 of the castle rooms. The museum presents more than 850 objects of collection with the aid of multimedia devices. The castle and the museum try to offer a modern vision of the heritage by presenting the past, the present and the future of the city. Night-time illuminations at the castle further reinforce the revival of the site.

The 500-metre round walk on the fortified ramparts provides views not just of the castle buildings and courtyards but also of the town.

Seven sequences of the museum
 The Castle, Nantes and Brittany back to the 17th century, 
 Nantes, daughter of the river and the ocean, 
 Commerce and the black gold in the 18th century, 
 Nantes in Revolution, 
 A colonial and industrial port (1815–1940), 
 A new city takes shape (1940–1990), 
 A great Atlantic city, today and tomorrow. 

The exhibition ends with a vision of the city, a multimedia creation by a contemporary artist, occupying the entire area of the 32nd room.
Pierrick Sorin is the first guest artist.

The illuminated castle
The night-lighting brings out the architectural complexity of the site within an urban context. The illumination was designed by Sylvie Sieg and Pierre Nègre of the Atelier Lumière and won the Light Originator Price of the Lumiville Trophy 2007.

Nantes History Museum in 2020 
On 12 October, after being asked by the Chinese regime not to use the words “Genghis Khan” and “Mongolia", Nantes History Museum stopped an exhibition project dedicated to the history of Genghis Khan and the Mongol Empire in partnership with a Chinese museum”. The director of the Nantes museum, Bertrand Guillet, says: “We made the decision to stop this production in the name of the human, scientific and ethical values that we defend in our institution”.

See also
 List of castles in France

References

External links
 Official website 
 Nantes Metropole Tourism Office 
 
 visite virtuelle 360 photo panoramique 
 castle pictures gallery

Bibliography
 Le château des ducs, Nantes et la Bretagne,  Guy SAUPIN, 2010.

Gallery

Castles in Brittany
Castles in Pays de la Loire
Buildings and structures in Nantes
Châteaux in Loire-Atlantique
Museums in Nantes
History of Brittany
Monuments historiques of Pays de la Loire
Squash venues